Every Bad Day Has Good News is the second mixtape by American rapper Radamiz. It was released on November 19, 2021, by Radamiz Is Limitless LLC. The album features guest appearances from Marlon Craft, Big E, Topaz Jones, Devin Tracy, Like, History, and Heaven Williams.

Release and promotion
In August 2021, Radamiz announced his follow up project to Synonyms of Strength in an interview with Gaspzine and revealed the project title "Every Bad Day Has Good News" On October 12, 2021, Radamiz released his first single "Spades", featuring Devin Tracy.

On October 26th, Radamiz released the second and final single "Caterpillar" featuring New York artist Marlon Craft."Caterpillar" earned him his second appearance on Ebro Darden's show on Apple Music 1 radio on November 9, 2021. Radamiz unveiled the tracklist on social media for Every Bad Day Has Good News on November 17th.

Track listing
Credits adapted from Tidal and iTunes' metadata.

Notes
 signifies an additional producer
 "Beautiful Man" features additional vocals by City James and Theonardo Dicaprio
 "God's +1" features additional vocals by Noah Guy
 "Spades" features additional vocals by NickyChulo
 "Caterpillar" features additional vocals by choob, Sebastian Mikael, and Rayana Jay
 "Humbly, Respectfully, Fuck You!" features additional vocals by Theonardo Dicaprio

Personnel

 Big E – featured artist
 Brandon "Brigante" Marquez – executive producer; A&R
 choob – producer ; additional vocals 
 Chris Conway – recording engineer  at No Mystery Studios in New York, New York
 City James – additional vocals 
 Devin Tracy – featured artist
 Eric "ZZ" Klem – recording engineer  at Studio Z in North Hollywood, California
 FifthGod – painting photography
 Gabe Monro – recording engineer  at House of Abundance in Harlem, New York
 Heaven Williams – featured artist
 Howard "History/H. Illa" Kennedy – featured artist; producer 
 Jack Monk – producer 
 Kenny Rivero – original painting
 Like – featured artist; producer 
 Marlon Craft – featured artist
 NickyChulo – art direction; additional vocals 
 NLCK – producer 
 Noah Guy – additional vocals 
 Radamiz – vocals; executive producer
 Rafael Moure – mixing engineer; mastering engineer
 Rayana Jay – additional vocals 
 Rook – producer 
 Sam Illy – producer 
 Sebastian Mikael – additional vocals 
 Tee-WaTT – producer 
 Thelonious Martin – producer 
 Theonardo Dicaprio – additional vocals 
 Topaz Jones – featured artist
 V'Don – producer 
 WASEEL – executive producer; producer ; recording engineer at Basewood Studios in Los Angeles, California

References

2021 albums
Mixtape albums